Maine's 8th congressional district is a former congressional district in Maine. It was created in 1833 and was eliminated in 1843.  Its last congressman was Elisha Hunt Allen.

List of members representing the district

References

 Congressional Biographical Directory of the United States 1774–present

08
Former congressional districts of the United States
Constituencies established in 1833
Constituencies disestablished in 1843
1833 establishments in Maine
1843 disestablishments in Maine